Marlowe Creek is a stream in Worth County in the U.S. state of Missouri.  It is a tributary of the Middle Fork Grand River.

A variant name was "Marlow Creek". The stream bears the name of a local minister.

See also
List of rivers of Missouri

References

Rivers of Worth County, Missouri
Rivers of Missouri